7th Signal Group (7 Sig Gp) is a military communications formation of the British Army's Royal Corps of Signals, currently subordinated to 11th Signal Brigade and Headquarters West Midlands.  The group oversees the close-support signal units of the corps tasked with supporting 3rd (UK) Division.

History 
Sometime after the announcement of Army 2020 in 2010, the 7th Signal Group was formed as part of the expanded 11th Signal Brigade and Headquarters West Midlands.  Along with the formation of the new group, the 2nd Signal Group was also formed, which oversaw the home resilience units.  7th Signal Group's mission was to control all the multi-role signal regiments under the Army 2020 programme.

Following the disbandment of the 2nd Signal Group in 2018, 7th Signal Group took control of the regiments within 2nd Signal Regiment, and now commands all close-support signal units.

Current structure 
The current structure of the group, as of March 2021 is:

 Headquarters, 7th Signal Group, at Beacon Barracks, Stafford
 1st Signal Regiment, Royal Corps of Signals, at Swinton Barracks, Perham Down — supports 20 Arm Inf Bde
 2nd Signal Regiment, Royal Corps of Signals, at Imphal Barracks, York — supports 1st (UK) Division
 3rd (United Kingdom) Division Signal Regiment, Royal Corps of Signals, at Kiwi Barracks, Bulford Camp — supports HQ 3rd (UK) Division
 15th Signal Regiment, Royal Corps of Signals, at Swinton Barracks, Perham Down — supports 12 Arm Inf Bde
 21st Signal Regiment, Royal Corps of Signals, at Azimghur Barracks, Colerne — supports 1 Arm Inf Bde
 37th Signal Regiment, Royal Corps of Signals (AR), in Redditch – paired with 1, 18 (UKSF), 22, 30, and 10 Signal Regiments

Footnotes 

Communications units and formations of the British Army
Group sized units of the British Army